Marcelo Herrera may refer to:

 Marcelo Herrera (footballer, born 1966), Argentine midfielder for Club Atlético Vélez Sarsfield
 Marcelo Herrera (footballer, born 1992), Argentine defender for Club Atlético Lanús
 Marcelo Herrera (footballer, born 1998), Argentine defender for San Lorenzo de Almagro